Richard William Evans (born 12 April 1968) is a Welsh former professional footballer who played as a winger. He is a member of the backroom staff with the Portugal national team. He previously played for several football clubs including Cardiff City, Exeter City and Bristol Rovers. Richard Evans is the son of former Swansea City player and Wales international footballer Brian Evans.

Career
After retiring from playing professional football Evans studied towards a Sports science BSc (Hons) at Loughborough University (1997–1999) and later a Physiotherapy BSc Hons at Brunel University (2002–2006).

Speaking to the BBC Wales, he said: "I pursued a career in football after leaving school. When I got to the age of 27 and had played professional and semi-professional football I realised that football wasn't going to provide me with a living after I'd finished my days really.
"So whilst I was playing at Lilleshall I did a treatment and management of injuries course held by the FA, and that's what instilled an interest in physiotherapy."

Prior to his appointment at Everton, he has held the position of Head Physiotherapist at Swansea City A.F.C. (1999–2009) and also Head of Sport Science at Wigan Athletic (2009–2013). In 2013, he was appointed Head of Performance at Everton Football Club. In August 2016, he joined the Belgium national football team backroom staff.

References

External links
 

Living people
1968 births
Welsh footballers
Association football wingers
Cardiff City F.C. players
Newport County A.F.C. players
Bristol Rovers F.C. players
Exeter City F.C. players
Yeovil Town F.C. players
Alumni of Loughborough University
Alumni of Brunel University London
Swansea City A.F.C. non-playing staff
Wigan Athletic F.C. non-playing staff
Everton F.C. non-playing staff